Scream! is a drop tower ride at Six Flags Fiesta Texas in San Antonio, Texas and Six Flags New England in Agawam, Massachusetts. Designed by S&S Worldwide, the ride propels riders up in the air, drops them halfway, brings them back up and finally brings them down to ground level. Both rides are nearly 20 stories high. Three additional drop towers installed at other Six Flags parks are known as Superman: Tower of Power.

Six Flags Fiesta Texas
Scream at Six Flags Fiesta Texas in San Antonio, Texas opened on March 13, 1999, in the Rockville section of the park. While it first opened with two towers (Possibly one Space Shot, one Turbo Drop), a third tower opened on May 28, 1999. It was the very first "combo tower" from S&S Power, combining the ride actions of both a Turbo Drop and Space Shot in one ride cycle. The ride was fabricated by Intermountain Lift, Inc.

Six Flags New England

A second ride at Six Flags New England in Agawam, Massachusetts opened in 1998, in the Main Street section, named Hellevator and painted red. In 2000, the ride was expanded, featuring two more towers and repainting the ride white. The two new towers then featured Turbo Drop, Space Shot, and Combo modes, while the original tower can only operate the Turbo Drop mode.

References

External links
 Scream at Six Flags Fiesta Texas ride page
 Scream at Six Flags New England ride page

Amusement rides manufactured by S&S – Sansei Technologies
Six Flags attractions
Drop tower rides
Towers completed in 1998
Towers completed in 1999
Amusement rides introduced in 1998
Amusement rides introduced in 1999
Six Flags Fiesta Texas
Six Flags New England
1999 establishments in Texas